Dumitru Antonescu (25 March 1945 – 25 April 2016) was a Romanian football player.

Club career
Dumitru Antonescu was born on 25 March 1945 in Constanța, Romania, starting to play football at junior level in 1957 at local club Electrica Constanța, after four years moving at Steaua București for one year, before returning to play at senior level for his hometown team FC Constanța, making his Divizia A debut on 15 February 1967 in a match which ended with a 1–0 victory against Petrolul Ploiești. In his 17 seasons spent at FC Constanța which include three Divizia B seasons, the highlight of this period was a fourth position at the end of the 1966–67 season and he managed to become the clubs all-time leader of Divizia A appearances with 390 games in which he scored 12 goals, making his last appearance in the competition on 24 November 1982 in a 1–1 against Dinamo București. In 1979 he spent a short period playing for Șoimii Cernavodă in Divizia C. After he ended his playing career, Antonescu was coach from 1985 until 1987 at Dunărea Călărași, after which he worked at Farul Constanța's youth center for almost three decades, spending the last year of his life as a technical director at ACS Prejmer, dying on 25 April 2016 in a hospital from Bucharest.

International career
Antonescu played 13 games for Romania making his debut on 29 October 1972 under coach Angelo Niculescu in a 2–0 home victory against Albania at the 1974 World Cup qualifiers in which he appeared in a total of five matches, including Romania's biggest ever victory, a 9–0 against Finland. He also played in a 3–1 victory against Greece at the 1973–76 Balkan Cup and his last game for the national team was a 0–0 against Denmark at the Euro 1976 qualifiers.

Honours
FC Constanța
Divizia B: 1980–81

Notes

References

External links

1945 births
2016 deaths
Association football defenders
Romanian footballers
Romania international footballers
FCV Farul Constanța players
Liga I players
Liga II players
Liga III players
Romanian football managers
FC Dunărea Călărași managers
Sportspeople from Constanța